Pınardere can refer to:

 Pınardere, Aydın
 Pınardere, Ayvacık